In historical linguistics, Italo-Celtic is a hypothetical grouping of the Italic and Celtic branches of the Indo-European language family on the basis of features shared by these two branches and no others. There is controversy about the causes of these similarities. They are usually considered to be innovations, likely to have developed after the breakup of the Proto-Indo-European language. It is also possible that some of these are not innovations, but shared conservative features, i.e. original Indo-European language features which have disappeared in all other language groups. What is commonly accepted is that the shared features may usefully be thought of as Italo-Celtic forms, as they are certainly shared by the two families and are almost certainly not coincidental.

Interpretations 
The traditional interpretation of the data is that both sub-groups of the Indo-European language family are generally more closely related to each other than to the other Indo-European languages. That could imply that they are descended from a common ancestor, Proto-Italo-Celtic, which can be partly reconstructed by the comparative method. Scholars who believe that Proto-Italo-Celtic was an identifiable historical language estimate that it was spoken in the 3rd or 2nd millennium BCE somewhere in South-Central Europe.

That hypothesis fell out of favour after it was re-examined by Calvert Watkins in 1966. Nevertheless, some scholars, such as Frederik Kortlandt, continued to be interested in the theory. In 2002 a paper by Ringe, Warnow and Taylor, employing computational methods as a supplement to the traditional linguistic subgrouping methodology, argued in favour of an Italo-Celtic subgroup, and in 2007 Kortlandt attempted a reconstruction of a Proto-Italo-Celtic. 

Emphatic support for an Italo-Celtic clade came from Celtologist Peter Schrijver in 1991. More recently, Schrijver (2016) has argued that Celtic arose in the Italian Peninsula as the first branch of Italo-Celtic to split off, with areal affinities to Venetic and Sabellian, and identified Proto-Celtic archaeologically with the Canegrate culture of the Late Bronze Age of Italy (c. 1300–1100 BC).

The most common alternative interpretation is that the proximity of Proto-Celtic and Proto-Italic over a long period could have encouraged the parallel development of what were already quite separate languages, as areal features within a Sprachbund. As Watkins (1966) puts it, "the community of -ī in Italic and Celtic is attributable to early contact, rather than to an original unity". The assumed period of language contact could then be later and perhaps continue well into the first millennium BC.

However, if some of the forms are archaic elements of Proto-Indo-European that were lost in other branches, neither model of post-PIE relationship must be postulated. Italic and especially Celtic also share several distinctive features with the Hittite language (an Anatolian language) and the Tocharian languages, and those features are certainly archaisms.

Forms 
The principal Italo-Celtic forms are:
 the thematic genitive in ī (dominus, dominī). Both in Italic (Popliosio Valesiosio, Lapis Satricanus) and in Celtic (Lepontic -oiso, Celtiberian -o), traces of the -osyo genitive of Proto-Indo-European (PIE) have also been discovered, which might indicate that the spread of the ī genitive occurred in the two groups independently (or by areal diffusion). The ī genitive has been compared to the so-called Cvi formation in Sanskrit, but that too is probably a comparatively late development. The phenomenon is probably related to the feminine long ī stems and the Luwian i-mutation.
 the formation of superlatives with reflexes of the PIE suffix *-ism̥mo- (Latin fortis, fortissimus "strong, strongest", Old Irish sen, sinem "old, oldest", Oscan mais, maimas "more, most"), where branches outside Italic and Celtic derive superlatives with reflexes of PIE *-isto- instead ( "broad, broadest",  "beautiful, fairest", Old Norse rauðr, rauðastr "red, reddest", as well as, of course, English "-est").
 the ā-subjunctive. Both Italic and Celtic have a subjunctive descended from an earlier optative in -ā-. Such an optative is not known from other languages, but the suffix occurs in Balto-Slavic and Tocharian past tense formations, and possibly in Hittite -ahh-.
 the collapsing of the PIE aorist and perfect into a single past tense. In both groups, this is a relatively late development of the proto-languages, possibly dating to the time of Italo-Celtic language contact.
 the assimilation of *p to a following *kʷ. This development obviously predates the Celtic loss of *p:
PIE *pekʷ- 'cook' → Latin coquere; Welsh pobi (Welsh p is from Proto-Celtic *kʷ)
PIE *penkʷe 'five' → Latin quīnque; Old Irish cóic, Welsh pump
PIE *perkʷu- 'oak' → Latin quercus; Goidelic ethnonym Querni, in northwest Hispania Querquerni

A number of other similarities continue to be pointed out and debated.

The r-passive (mediopassive voice) was initially thought to be an innovation restricted to Italo-Celtic until it was found to be a retained archaism shared with Hittite, Tocharian, and possibly the Phrygian language.

References

Bibliography

Further reading 
 Jasanoff, Jay, "An Italo-Celtic isogloss: the 3 pl. mediopassive in *-ntro," in D. Q. Adams (ed.), Festschrift for Eric P. Hamp. Volume I (= Journal of Indo-European Studies Monograph 23) (Washington, D.C., 1997): 146-161.
 Ivšić, Dubravka. "Italo-Celtic Correspondences in Verb Formation". In: Studia Celto-Slavica 3 (2010): 47–59. DOI: https://doi.org/10.54586/IPBD8569.
 Lehmann, Winfred P. "Frozen Residues and Relative Dating", in Varia on the Indo-European Past: Papers in Memory of Marija Gimbutas, eds. Miriam Robbins Dexter and Edgar C. Polomé. Washington D.C.: Institute for the Study of Man, 1997. pp. 223–46
 Lehmann, Winfred P. "Early Celtic among the Indo-European dialects", in Zeitschrift für celtische Philologie 49-50, Issue 1 (1997): 440-54.
 
 Schmidt, Karl Horst, “Contributions from New Data to the Reconstruction of the Proto-Language”. In:

External links 
 

 
Indo-European languages
Celtic languages
Italic languages
Proposed language families